Zoran Záhradník (born 19 August 2005) is a Slovak footballer who currently plays for Fortuna Liga club FC DAC 1904 Dunajská Streda and for FC ŠTK 1914 Šamorín as a forward, on loan from Zemplín Michalovce.

Club career

Zemplín Michalovce
Záhradník made his Slovak league debut for MFK Zemplín Michalovce against MFK Tatran Liptovský Mikuláš on 21 August 2021. He has become the second youngest player (together with Jakub Vojtuš), playing in the top Slovak football league, after Andrej Rendla. Even before his debut, however, Záhradník attracted the attention of Italian team Spezia Calcio, featuring in trials at the club.

References

External links
 
 
 Futbalnet profile 

2005 births
Living people
People from Michalovce
Sportspeople from the Košice Region
Slovak footballers
Association football forwards
MFK Zemplín Michalovce players
FC DAC 1904 Dunajská Streda players
FC ŠTK 1914 Šamorín players
Slovak Super Liga players
2. Liga (Slovakia) players